Rio Vista High School is a public high school located in the city of Rio Vista, California. The school is in the River Delta Unified School District.

Statistics

Demographics 
2016-17

Enrollment by Subgroup 2016-17

Standardized testing

Student activities

Athletics 
 Boys' Basketball
 Girls' Basketball
 Baseball
 1987-88 Section Champions
 Softball
 Football
 Girls’ Soccer
 Boys’ Soccer
 Golf
 Swimming
 Wrestling

References 

Public high schools in California
High schools in Solano County, California